Finnic or Fennic may refer to:

 Finnic culture
 Finnic languages
 Baltic Finnic languages
 Finnic peoples
 Baltic Finnic peoples commonly referred to as just Finnic in a Western context, are the Finnic peoples historically inhabiting the region around the Baltic Sea
 Volga Finns, commonly referred to as just Finnic in a Russian context, and the Finnic peoples historically inhabiting the Vogal basin
 Finnic mythologies, the mythologies of the various Finnic peoples

Language and nationality disambiguation pages